The Institute for Plasma Research (IPR) is an autonomous physics research institute in India. The institute is involved in research in aspects of plasma science including basic plasma physics, research on magnetically confined hot plasmas and plasma technologies for industrial applications. It is a large and leading plasma physics organization in India. The institute is mainly funded by the Department of Atomic Energy. IPR is playing a major scientific and technical role in Indian partnership in the international fusion energy initiative ITER. It is part of the IndiGO consortium for research on gravitational waves.

History 

In 1982, the Government of India initiated the Plasma Physics Programme (PPP) for research on magnetically confined high temperature plasmas. 

In 1986, the PPP evolved into the autonomous Institute for Plasma Research under the Department of Science and Technology. 

With the commissioning of ADITYA in 1989, full-fledged tokamak experiments started at IPR. A decision was taken in 1995 to build the second generation superconducting steady state tokamak SST-1, capable of 1000-second operation. Due to this, the institute grew rapidly and came under the Department of Atomic Energy. The industrial plasma activities were reorganised under the Facilitation Centre for Industrial Plasma Technologies (FCIPT) and moved to a separate campus in Gandhinagar in 1998.

Location 
The Institute for Plasma Research is located on the banks of the Sabarmati river in Bhat village of Gandhinagar district. It is approximately midway between the cities of Ahmedabad and Gandhinagar. It is 5 km from the Ahmedabad airport and 14 km from the Ahmedabad railway station.

Remote campuses 

 Facilitation Centre for Industrial Plasma Technologies (FCIPT)
 Centre of Plasma Physics - Institute for Plasma Research (CPP-IPR)
 ITER-India

Facilitation Centre for Industrial Plasma Technologies (FCIPT) 
The Facilitation Centre for Industrial Plasma Technologies is a division of the Institute for Plasma Research working in industrial plasma technologies. The centre was set up in 1997 to promote, foster, develop, demonstrate and transfer industrially relevant plasma-based technologies to industries, thus enabling technology commercialization. The centre acts as an interface between the institute and industries. While working with the industry on industrial projects, FCIPT has maintained and improved its R&D strengths and, at the same time, has shown competence to work in an industrial manner.

It has national and international industries in its clients base such as Johnson & Johnson,ASP Ethicon Inc. USA, UVSYSTEC GmbH Germany, Thermax India Ltd., Mahindra & Mahindra Ltd., IPCL, Larsen & Toubro Ltd., NHPC Ltd., GE India Technology Centre Bangalore, BHEL, Triton Valves Ltd. Mysore, etc. and other organizations such as BARC, DRDO, ISRO, IIT Kharagpur, National Aerospace Laboratories, other CSIR labs, etc. Amongst the infrastructure FCIPT has a full-fledged material characterization laboratory with instruments such as Transmission Electron Microscope, Field Emission Scanning Electron Microscope with EDAX, Atomic Force Microscope, X-ray diffractometer, Spectroscopic Ellipsometer, UV-VIS spectroscopy, solar simulator, thickness profilometer, optical metallurgical microscope with phase analyser, full-fledged metallography laboratory, Vicker's hardness tester, ASTM B117 corrosion testing setup, etc. Other infrastructure include electronics and instrumentation lab, process demonstration systems, etc.

FCIPT has developed technologies related to waste remediation and recovery of energy from waste, surface hardening and heat treatment technologies such as plasma nitriding and plasma nitrcarburizing, plasma-assisted metallization technologies using magnetron sputter deposition, Plasma-enhanced CVD for functional coatings on substrates, plasma melting, plasma diagnostics, space-related plasma technologies, etc.

Recently, ion irradiation induced patterning of semiconductor materials and amorphous solids has been a hot topic of research.

Industries can directly contact FCIPT for their contract research needs, development of specialized plasma processing equipment and power sources, technology development, application development, material characterization services, etc.

Center of Plasma Physics - Institute for Plasma Research (CPP-IPR)

History 
In pursuance of the national policy recognising plasma physics as one of the thrust areas of present-day research, the government of Assam established the Centre of Plasma Physics in 1991 as an autonomous research institute to pursue basic research in theoretical as well as experimental plasma physics and its related areas. The Centre of Plasma Physics was an autonomous research institute under the Education (Higher) Department of the government of Assam. The centre started functioning in April 1991 in a rented house located at Saptaswahid Path, Dispur, Guwahati. The Governing Council of the centre consists of four eminent scientists of the country with representatives from the Institute for Plasma Research, Gandhinagar, Physical Research Laboratory, Ahmedabad, Bhabha Atomic Research Center, Bombay and Saha Institute of Nuclear Physics, Calcutta; top-level state government officers and some local members. The first chairman of the Governing Council was Professor Predhiman Krishan Kaw (died June 18, 2017, of Institute for Plasma Research, Gandhinagar), a world-renowned plasma scientist who took keen interest for the all-round development of the centre. After the expiry of its three years' term, the Governing Council of the centre was reconstituted by the Education Department with Prof. A.C. Das, Dean of Physical Research Laboratory as its chairman. The founding director of the centre, Prof. Sarbeswar Bujarbarua, is a distinguished plasma scientist of the country and a recipient of the `Vikram Sarabhai Research Award' in 1989 and Kamal Kumari National Award in 1993.

Over the last few years after its formation, the centre has taken up several theoretical investigations in fundamental plasma processes such as nonlinear phenomena, instabilities, dusty plasma and has set up facilities for conducting basic plasma physics experiments. Funds are available from several central government agencies (e.g. the Department of Atomic Energy and the Department of Science and Technology), the centre has taken up experimental programmes in the frontline areas of plasma physics, such as dense plasma focus and dusty plasma. During the last seven years the centre has published more than 50 original research papers in standard international journals. The scientists of the centre are working in close collaboration with national and international institutes like the Institute for Plasma Research, Gandhinagar; Physical Research Laboratory, Ahmedabad; Bhabha Atomic Research Centre, Bombay; Regional Research Laboratory, Bhubaneswar; Saha Institute of Nuclear Physics, Calcutta, Kyushu University, Japan; University of Bayreuth, Germany; Culham Laboratory, UK; and Flinders University, Australia, to name a few. The centre also runs a Ph.D. programme with students registering with Guwahati University. Another component of the academic activity of the centre consists of holding lecturers and colloquia on plasma physics and other branches of physical sciences.

The Center of Plasma Physics, Institute for Plasma Research, Sonapur, Kamrup, Assam, became a new campus of IPR as the Center of Plasma Physics, Sonapur, was formally merged with IPR with effect from 29 May 2009. CPP-IPR is headed by Centre Director Dr K. S. Goswami and is managed by a Managing Board headed by the director of IPR. It has at present twelve faculty members, fourteen other staff and a number of research scholars and project scientists. The theoretical and experimental research is oriented towards basic plasma physics as well as programs that complement the major programmes at IPR.

Campus 
The institute's campus is at Nazirakhat, Sonapur, about 32 km from Guwahati, the headquarters of the Kamrup(M) district of Assam. Nazirakhat is a rural area surrounded by peace-loving people of diverse caste, religion and language; yet it presents the unique feature of unity in diversity. Nazirakhat is linked by a PWD road from the National Highway No. 37. It is about 800 metres from NH-37. Nazirakhat is linked by road with the rest of the state and the country. The institute is surrounded by greenery and it is near the Air-India flying base at Sonapur.

Publication 
Several research papers have been published after the establishment of the institute in journals like Phys. Scr., Phys. Lett. A, Phys. Rev. Lett. and so on

Collaboration 
The Centre of Plasma Physics - Institute for Plasma Research has active collaboration with the following institutes and universities:

The Bhabha Atomic Research Centre, Bombay; Raja Ramanna Centre for Advanced Technology, Indore; Institute for Plasma Research, Gandinagar; IPP, Juelich, Germany; IPP, Garching, Germany; Kyushu University, Fukuoka, Japan; Physical Research Laboratory, Ahmedabad; National Institute for Interdisciplinary Science and Technology, Bhubaneswar; Ruhr University Bochum, Bochum, Germany; Saha Institute of Nuclear Physics, Calcutta; St. Andrews University, UK; Tokyo Metropolitan Institute of Technology, Tokyo; University of Bayreuth, Germany; and University of Kyoto, Japan.

Awards and recognition 
 S. Sen, Associate Professor, had been awarded EPSRC Professorship Award (1998), UK; JSPS Professorship Award (1999), Japan; Junior Membership Award (1999), Isaac Newton Institute for Mathematical Sciences, Cambridge, UK; and Associateship Award (1999-2005), ICTP, Trieste, Italy. 
 S.R. Mohanty, presently Assistant Professor, had been awarded Ph.D. degree by the University of Delhi for his thesis entitled "X-ray studies on dense plasma focus and plasma processing". 
 M. Kakati, Research Scientist, had been awarded Senior Research Fellowship of the Council of Scientific & Industrial Research (1999-2001).
 K. R. Rajkhowa, had been awarded Plasma Science Society of India Fellowship for the year 1999. 
 B.J. Saikia, Research Scientist, had been awarded Japan Society for the Promotion of Science post doctoral fellowship for two years in 1999. 
 B. Kakati, Research Scholar, has been awarded the BUTI Young Scientist Award in 2011.

ITER-India 
ITER will be built mostly through in-kind contributions from the participant countries (Parties) in the form of components manufactured by the Parties and delivered/installed at ITER.

ITER-India  is the Indian Domestic Agency (DA), formed with the responsibility to provide to ITER the Indian contribution.

See also
 Aditya (tokamak)
 Indira Gandhi Center for Atomic Research (IGCAR)
 Department of Atomic Energy

References

External links 
 Official website of the Institute for Plasma Research
 Aditya tokamak
 SST-1 Tokamak
 Facilitation Centre for Industrial Plasma Technologies

Atomic and nuclear energy research in India
Nuclear technology in India
Homi Bhabha National Institute
Plasma physics facilities
Research institutes in Ahmedabad
Research institutes in Gujarat
1986 establishments in Gujarat
Research institutes established in 1986